The Massachusetts Medical Society (MMS) is the oldest continuously operating state medical association in the United States. Incorporated on November 1, 1781, by an act of the Massachusetts General Court, the MMS is a non-profit organization that consists of more than 25,000 physicians, medical students and residents. It is currently based in Waltham, Massachusetts. The majority of the members live or practice in Massachusetts and the immediate vicinity.

Publication

The Massachusetts Medical Society is the owner and publisher of the New England Journal of Medicine, which is the most widely read and cited medical journal in the world. The New England Journal of Medicine is also the oldest continuously published and circulating medical journal in the world and has an impact factor of 91.2, which is the highest among all the medical journals in the world. It also publishes the Journal Watch family of professional newsletters. NEJM Journal Watch publishes the following topics:
 Cardiology
 Emergency Medicine
 Gastroenterology
 General Medicine
 HIV/AIDS
 Hospital Medicine
 Infectious Diseases
 Neurology
 Oncology and Hematology
 Pediatrics and Adolescent Medicine
 Psychiatry
 Women's Health
 Blogs

In addition to its publishing activities, the key activities of the MMS include medical education for physicians, public health education for physicians and the public, legislative and regulatory advocacy for physicians and patients, and health policy research.

History 
The charter of the MMS is signed by Samuel Adams as president of the Massachusetts Senate, and John Hancock as Governor of Massachusetts.

References

External links 
  of the Massachusetts Medical Society
 
 

Medical Society
American Medical Association
1781 establishments in Massachusetts
Organizations established in 1781